Perry Friedman (born May 15, 1968) is an American professional poker player who won the 2002 World Series of Poker $1,500 Limit Omaha Hi-Low Split-8 or Better event and is a founding member of the Tiltboys.

World Series of Poker 
Friedman has cashed 33 times at the World Series of Poker (WSOP), winning the 2002 World Series of Poker $1,500 Limit Omaha Hi-Low Split-8 or Better event, earning $176,860, he also has made six other final tables, 3rd in the $2,500 Seven-card stud event at the 2000 World Series of Poker won by Chris Ferguson, 4th at the 2002 World Series of Poker in the $2,000 S.H.O.E. event won by Phil Ivey, 3rd in the $2,000 No Limit Hold'em event at the 2005 World Series of Poker won by Erik Seidel, 7th in the 2007 World Series of Poker $3,000 No Limit Hold'em event won by Shankar Pillai, 4th in the 2012 World Series of Poker $5,000 Seven-card stud event won by John Monnette, and 3rd in the 2017 World Series of Poker $10,000 Seven-card stud event won by Mike Wattel.

World Series of Poker bracelets

Other poker events 
At the World Poker Tour 2004 Legends of Poker, Friedman just missed making the six-player final table finishing in 9th for $49,575.

, his total live tournament winnings exceed $1,082,000. His 43 cashes as the WSOP account for $1,003,709 of those winnings.

References

External links
 Official Facebook page

1968 births
American poker players
Living people
World Series of Poker bracelet winners
Stanford University alumni